is a passenger railway station located in the city of Miyoshi, Tokushima, Japan, operated by Shikoku Railway Company (JR Shikoku).

Lines
Some traffic for the Tokushima Line (B25) also uses this station.

Station layout
The station has two island platforms and one side platform, serving a total of five tracks. The platforms are connected by a footbridge. The station has a "Midori no Madoguchi" staffed ticket office.

Adjacent stations

History
Awa-Ikeda Station opened on 25 March 1928. With the privatization of JNR on 1 April 1987, the station came under the control of JR Shikoku.

Passenger statistics
In fiscal 2019, the station was used by an average of 776 passengers daily

Surrounding area
Miyoshi City Hall
Tokushima Prefectural Ikeda High School

See also
 List of Railway Stations in Japan

References

External links

 Official home page

Railway stations in Tokushima Prefecture
Railway stations in Japan opened in 1928
Miyoshi, Tokushima